Schistostege decussata is a moth of the family Geometridae. It is found in south-eastern and eastern Europe up to Ukraine. In Hungary and Lower Austria, the yellow-brown form is found.

The wingspan is 24–32 mm. Adults are on wing from June to July.

The larvae mainly feed on Euphorbia and Taraxacum species. Larvae can be found from April to June.

Subspecies
 Schistostege decussata decussata
 Schistostege decussata dinarica (Schawerda 1913)
 Schistostege decussata flavata Barajon, 1952
 Schistostege decussata lugubrata Hartig, 1971
 Schistostege decussata rumelica Rebel & Zerny, 1931

References

External links

Lepiforum.de

Moths described in 1775
Chesiadini
Moths of Europe
Taxa named by Michael Denis
Taxa named by Ignaz Schiffermüller